Water polo was contested for men only at the 1970 Central American and Caribbean Games in Panama City, Panama.

References
 

1970 Central American and Caribbean Games
1970
1970 in water polo